Charles-Félix Tavano (19 April 1887 – 29 May 1963) was a French film director as well as a screenwriter.

Filmography

Director 
 1931: Deux fois vingt ans
 1932: Arrêtez-moi!
 1932: Un client de province
 1932: Billeting Order 
 1934: Les Deux Papas
 1935:  (Italian version of the French film  by Jean Dréville)
 1935:   – short film –
 1935: 
 1948: Impeccable Henri 
 1949: 
 1949: Eve and the Serpent
 1951:

Unit production manager 
 1939: Sacred Woods
 1943: 
 1943: 
 1945: A Cage of Nightingales
 1946: Once is Enough
 1947: Antoine and Antoinette

Assistant-director 
 1931: Cœur de Paris by Jean Benoît-Lévy and Marie Epstein

Publications 
 Charles-Félix Tavano and Marcel Yonnet,  Quelques histoires de cinéma, Jules Tallandier Éditeur, Paris, 1923.
 Terres rouges – roman de la terre corse, Jules Tallandier Éditeur, Paris, 1927
 Quand l'amour nous mène, novel, Jules Tallandier Éditeur, Paris 1930.
 À l'ombre des buildings, novel, Jules Tallandier Éditeur, Paris 1931.

External links 

 
 22 films liés à Charles-Félix Tavano sur CinéRessources.net
 Charles-Félix Tavano sur lesgensducinema.com
 Charles-Félix Tavano sur cinema-francais.fr

French film directors
20th-century French screenwriters
People from Nice
1887 births
1963 deaths